Gabino Alberto Velasco Rivas (born April 9, 1984, in Mexico City) is a former Mexican professional footballer, who was brought up by Querétaro FC. He made his debut April 8, 2006, a day before his birthday, against CD Veracruz, a game which resulted in a 3–0 victory for Cruz Azul.

On December 9, 2012, Cruz Azul signed him as a full international in 2013. He first played in the Primera Division for CF Puebla from August 2013 to March 2014 before joining Cruz Azul on September 18, 2014. He helped them win the Liga MX championship for the second time and made his Mexico debut against Honduras.

He last played for Venados on loan from Cruz Azul in the Ascenso MX league of Mexico.

External links

1984 births
Living people
Footballers from Mexico City
Cruz Azul footballers
Irapuato F.C. footballers
Club León footballers
Querétaro F.C. footballers
Mexican footballers
Association football midfielders